Wayne Langerholc Jr. is a Pennsylvania attorney, former prosecutor, and politician. A Republican, he is the Pennsylvania State Senator for the 35th district. Before his election to the state senate in 2016, Langerholc was an assistant district attorney in Cambria County and a township supervisor. He attended Widener University Commonwealth Law School in Harrisburg, PA.

Langerholc initially expected to face five-term Democratic incumbent John N. Wozniak, but Wozniak retired just three months before the election. Wozniak was replaced on the ballot by Cambria County controller Ed Cernic Jr. Langerholc benefited from Donald Trump winning the district with 71 percent of the vote, which was Trump's second-best showing in the state.

References

External links
Wayne Langerholc for State Senate
Pennsylvania State Senate

Living people
Republican Party Pennsylvania state senators
Pennsylvania lawyers
Juniata College alumni
Widener University alumni
Year of birth missing (living people)
Widener University Commonwealth Law School alumni
21st-century American politicians